Tafil Musović (born 1950) is a painter who lives and works in Amsterdam, Netherlands, since 1988. He was born in Yugoslavia, in the province of Kosovo, and lived in Belgrade, the capital, from 1952.  In his last years in Yugoslavia, he had an atelier in Zemun until 1988.

Biography
Musović was born in Mlečane, a village near Mališevo in the province of Kosovo, Yugoslavia. He graduated from the Academy of Fine Art in Belgrade (1969–1974), where he also did his postgraduate studies (1977–1979).

He won the Prize for the Best Drawings on the Academy of Fine Arts in Belgrade, 1970, and the Prize for the best exhibition of 1997 in Belgrade, given by TV/Radio Studio B. Basisstipendium - Fonds voor Beeldende kunsten, 1996, 2000, 2004, 2008

Art
Tafil Musović appeared on the art scene at the time of change styling concepts in fine art from figuration to expression of new wave at the beginning of the 1980s. But first appearances showed a distinct authorial personality that is imposed not only in the professional community but also the wider population of art devotee. After moving to Amsterdam, basically kept constructed visual language, but it has completed the European and specific Dutch painting tradition that is well understood and creatively absorbed in his work. Today Musović is remained committed to figuratives and portraits, but now with an in-depth review dimensions of
artistic tradition.

Exhibitions (solo)
1977 Galerija grafickog kolektiva, Belgrade
1978 National Museum, Leskovac
1979 Galerija Doma omladine, Belgrade
1982 Galerija Kolarcevog narodnog univerziteta, Belgrade
1982 Galerija Kolarcevog narodnog univerziteta, Belgrade
1984 Galerija Studentskog kulturnog centra, Belgrade
1986 Salon Muzeja savremene umetnosti, Belgrade
1987 Happy Gallery, Belgrade
1992 Galerie de Blauwe Leuning, The Hague
1995 Galerie de Schone Kunsten, Haarlem
1995 Galerie de Blauwe Leuning, The Hague
1997 Galerie de Schone Kunsten, Haarlem
1997 Galerija ULUS, Belgrade
1998 Galerie de Blauwe Leuning, The Hague
1998 Galerija Fakulteta likovnih umetnosti, Belgrade
1999 De Annex, Galerie Maria Chailloux, Amsterdam
2001 Galerie Maria Chailloux, Amsterdam
2002 Galerie Jacoba Wijk, Groningen
2003 Wendingen, Amstelkerk, Amsterdam
2003 Galerija grafickog kolektiva, Belgrade
2005 RC de Ruimte, IJmuiden
2005 RC de Ruimte, IJmuiden
2006 RC de Ruimte, IJmuiden
2007 Galerie 59, van Eeghenstraat 59-1, Amsterdam
2008 RC de Ruimte, IJmuiden
2008 Galerija grafickog kolektiva, Belgrade
2008 Art Pavillon “Cvijeta Zuzoric”, Retrospective 1978 - 2008, Belgrade
2009 Ververs modern art gallery, Amsterdam
2009 Centre culturel de Serbie, Paris
2010 Galerija grafickog kolektiva, Belgrade

Bibliography
1978 Zdravko Vučinić, Galerija Natodnog muzeja, (catalogue), Leskovac
1982 Jerko Denegri, Galerija Kolarčeve zadužbine, (catalogue), Belgrade
1982 Jovan Despotović, Žestoki potezi bojom - Tafil Musović, Književne novine, 9. decembre, Belgrade
1984 Lidija Mernik, Galerija SKC, (catalogue), Belgrade
1986 Mladen Kozomara, Salon Muzeja savremene umetnosti, (catalogue), Belgrade
1986 Jovan Despotović, Značenje scene, Meaning of scene, Jedinstvo, 29 novembre, Priština
1987 Dragica Vukadinović, Srećna galerija SKS, (catalogue), Belgrade
1995 Onno Groustra: Haarlems Dagblad, 11 maart 1995 Landschappelijke zelfportretten, Amsterdam
1997 Zoran Gavrić, Galerija ULUS, (catalogue), Belgrade
1997 Lidija Merenik: Intervju 04 jul 97 Slikarstvo velikog nemira, Belgrade
1997 Mihailo Kandić: Likovni Život, June 1997 Tafil Musović, The Paintings of, Belgrade
1997 Bas Donker van Heel: Haarlems Dagblad, 23 januari 1997 Schone Kunsten etaleert eigenzinnige tekenaars, Amsterdam
1998 Hans Dekkers: Destroyed Gardens (on the series: The Expulsion from Paradise), (catalogue), Amsterdam
1998 Patty Wageman, (catalogue), Amsterdam
2001 Milena Marjanović: BLIC, Intervju 19 mar 2001 Najteže mi pada diskriminacija, Belgrade
2001 Marina Martić: Place/ Time/ Identity (on the series: Max Beckmann in Amsterdam), (catalogue), Amsterdam
2002 Milena Marjanović: BLIC, Intervju 28 feb 2002 Umetnik nije sveta krava, Belgrade
2002 Lidija Merenik: A conversation with Uccello, (on the series: Saint George and the Dragon), (catalogue), Amsterdam
2002 Milena Marjanović: Dear Tafil (on the series: Saint George and the Dragon), (catalogue), Amsterdam
2002 Patty Wageman: A world of good and evil (on the series: Saint George and the Dragon), (catalogue), Amsterdam
2004 Vojislav Stojanović, (monography), Belgrade
2006 Wim de Wagt: Haarlems Dagblad, 24 mei 2006 Alsof er iemand op een trom spuugde, Haarlem
2008 Liljana Ćinkul, (catalogue), Belgrade
2008 Milena Marjanović, Qui non ha luogo il Santo Volto, (catalogue), Belgrade
2008 René Huigen, Drawing is Speaking and Writing at the Same Time, (catalogue), Belgrade
2008 On Retrospective 1978 - 2008, Art Pavillon “Cvijeta Zuzoric” and Exhibition in Galerija grafickog kolektiva, Belgrade
2010 Tafil Musović, works on paper, (monography), Galerija Grafički kolektiv, Belgrade

References

Sources
http://www.tafilmusovic.nl
http://www.novosti.rs/vesti/kultura.71.html:418916-Tafil-Musovic-Slikam-da-bih-opstao
 Documentation of the Museum of Contemporary Art, Belgrade
 Tafil, (monograph), ULUS, Belgrade, 2008

External links

1950 births
Living people
Dutch painters
Dutch male painters
Serbian painters
Yugoslav expatriates in the Netherlands
Dutch contemporary artists
Serbian contemporary artists
Painters from Amsterdam